Sir William Ewen Stavert, KBE (9 April 1861 – 31 December 1937) was a Canadian banker. He was Financial Adviser to the Government of Newfoundland from 1932 until his death.

Born in Summerside, Prince Edward Island, Stavert worked in Canadian banking for forty years. During the First World War, he was Financial Controller in the British Ministry of Information and its Accounting Officer to HM Treasury; he was knighted KBE in 1919.

Appointed Financial Adviser to the Government of Newfoundland in 1932, he was Newfoundland's representative on the Newfoundland Royal Commission, which recommended the suspension of responsible government.

References 

1861 births
1937 deaths
Canadian bankers
Canadian Knights Commander of the Order of the British Empire
Civil servants in the Ministry of Information (United Kingdom)